Garden Prairie is an unincorporated former village and census-designated place located in Boone County, Illinois, United States. It is part of the Rockford, Illinois Metropolitan Statistical Area.

History
Garden Prairie was originally called Amesville, in honor of a pioneer settler. The present name refers to the fertility of their surrounding land on the prairie. A post office was established as Amesville in 1838, and renamed Garden Prairie in 1853.

On February 2, 2010, residents voted 57-46 to dissolve the village, only 2 years after incorporating by a 62 - 44 vote on February 5, 2008.

Geography
Garden Prairie is located at  (42.25333, -88.72472). It is roughly centered between Marengo and Belvidere, at the intersection of US Highway 20 and Garden Prairie Road.

Demographics
As of the 2020 census there were 300 people, 118 households, and 66 families residing in the CDP. The racial makeup of the CDP was 85.00% White, 0.33% African American, 1.33% Native American, 0.67% Asian, 0.00% Pacific Islander, 1.33% from other races, and 11.33% from two or more races. Hispanic or Latino of any race were 12.33% of the population.

There were 118 households, out of which 30.51% had children under the age of 18 living with them, 23.73% were married couples living together, 32.20% had a female householder with no husband present, and 44.07% were non-families. 11.86% of all households were made up of individuals, and 0.00% had someone living alone who was 65 years of age or older. The average household size was 2.53 and the average family size was 2.25.

The CDP's age distribution consisted of 13.6% under the age of 18, 14.3% from 18 to 24, 5.3% from 25 to 44, 37.4% from 45 to 64, and 29.4% who were 65 years of age or older. The median age was 47.0 years. For every 100 females, there were 136.6 males. For every 100 females age 18 and over, there were 104.5 males.

References

External links

Census-designated places in Boone County, Illinois
Census-designated places in Illinois
Populated places established in 2008
Populated places disestablished in 2010
Rockford metropolitan area, Illinois
Former municipalities in Illinois
Former populated places in Illinois
Unincorporated communities in Boone County, Illinois
Unincorporated communities in Illinois
2008 establishments in Illinois